Lawless World: America and the Making and Breaking of Global Rules is a book by the British lawyer and author, Philippe Sands. It was published by Viking Adult in October 2005. Sands is a professor of international law at University College London.

Among other issues, the book discusses the creation of the International Criminal Court and the Kyoto Protocol. The book seeks to document how the United States is abandoning international law. A new edition of the book also discloses the Bush-Blair memo related to the planning for the Iraq War.

BBC World service writes, “Downing Street has refused to comment on the authenticity of the source material for the book.”

References

External links
"Fresh claims about the build-up to Iraq war", BBC World Service, 3 February 2006

2005 non-fiction books
Political books
International law literature